Jan Bernášek (born 31 May 1986 in Moravská Třebová, Czechoslovakia) is a Czech chess player. He achieved the title of a Grandmaster in 2013.

Notable Tournaments

References

Living people
Chess grandmasters
1986 births
People from Moravská Třebová
Czech chess players